Neuss Rheinpark-Center station is in the city of Neuss in the German state of North Rhine-Westphalia. It is located in the Neuss Rheinpark Center business park and shopping centre. It is on the Mönchengladbach–Düsseldorf railway and it is classified by Deutsche Bahn as a category 5 station. The station opened on 29 May 1988 on the new line built with the Hamm railway bridge opened by the Bergisch-Märkische Railway Company on 24 July 1870.

The station is served by three lines of the Rhine-Ruhr S-Bahn, S 8 (running between Hagen and Mönchengladbach), S 11 (running between Düsseldorf Airport and Bergisch Gladbach) and S 28 (running between Mettmann Stadtwald or Wuppertal and Kaarster See), each operating every 20 minutes during the day.

It is also served by bus route 842, operated by Stadtwerke Neuss at 20-minute intervals, and by bus route 874, operated by Busverkehr Rheinland at 60- to 180-minute intervals.

References

Rhine-Ruhr S-Bahn stations
S8 (Rhine-Ruhr S-Bahn)
S11 (Rhine-Ruhr S-Bahn)
S28 (Rhine-Ruhr S-Bahn)
Neuss
Buildings and structures in Rhein-Kreis Neuss
Railway stations in Germany opened in 1988